Diamesini is a tribe of midges in the non-biting midge family (Chironomidae).

Genera & species
Genus Arctodiamesa Makarchenko, 1983
A. appendiculata (Lundström, 1915)
A. breviramosa Makarchenko, 1995
A. marinae Makarchenko, 2005
Genus Diamesa Meigen in Gistl, 1835
D. aberrata Lundbeck, 1898
D. alata Storå, 1945
D. alpina Tokunaga, 1936
D. amanoi Makarchenko & Kobayashi, 1997
D. amplexivirilia Hansen, 1976
D. ancysta Roback, 1959
D. arctica (Boheman, 1865)
D. bertrami Edwards, 1935
D. bohemani Goetghebuer, 1932
D. cheimatophila Hansen, 1976
D. chiobates Hansen, 1976
D. chorea Lundbeck, 1898
D. cinerella Meigen in Gistl, 1835
D. clavata Edwards, 1933
D. colenae Hansen, 1976
D. dactyloidea Makarchenko, 1988
D. dampfi (Kieffer, 1924)
D. davisi Edwards, 1933
D. filicauda Tokunaga, 1966
D. garretti Sublette & Sublette, 1965
D. geminata Kieffer, 1926
D. goetghebueri Pagast, 1947
D. gregsoni Edwards, 1933
D. hamaticornis Kieffer, 1924
D. haydaki Hansen, 1976
D. heteropus (Coquillett, 1905)
D. hyperborea Holmgren, 1869
D. incallida (Walker, 1856)
D. insignipes Kieffer in Kieffer & Thienemann, 1908
D. japonica Tokunaga, 1936
D. kasymovi Kownacki & Kownacka, 1973
D. laticauda Serra-Tosio, 1964
D. latitarsis (Goetghebuer, 1921)
D. lavillei Serra-Tosio, 1969
D. leona Roback, 1957
D. leoniella Hansen, 1976
D. lindrothi Goetghebuer, 1931
D. longipes Goetghebuer, 1941
D. macronyx (Kieffer, 1918)
D. martae Kownacki & Kownacka, 1980
D. mendotae Muttkowski, 1915
D. modesta Serra-Tosio, 1967
D. nivicavernicola Hansen, 1976
D. nivoriunda (Fitch, 1847)
D. nowickiana Kownacki & Kownacka, 1975
D. permacra (Walker, 1856)
D. plumicornis Tokunaga, 1936
D. serratosioi Willassen, 1986
D. simplex Kieffer, 1926
D. sommermani Hansen, 1976
D. spinacies Sæther, 1969
D. spitzbergensis Kieffer, 1919
D. starmachi Kownacki & Kownacka, 1970
D. steinboecki Goetghebuer, 1933
D. Sætheri Willassen, 1986
D. tenuipes Goetghebuer, 1938
D. thomasi Serra-Tosio, 1970
D. tonsa (Haliday in Walker, 1856)
D. tsutsuii Tokunaga, 1936
D. vaillanti Serra-Tosio, 1972
D. valkanovi Sæther, 1968
D. veletensis Serra-Tosio, 1971
D. vernalis Makarchenko, 1977
D. vockerothi Hansen, 1976
D. wuelkeri Serra-Tosio, 1964
D. zernyi Edwards, 1933
Genus Lappodiamesa Serra-Tosio, 1968
L. multiseta Makarchenko, 1995
L. vidua (Kieffer, 1922)
L. willasseni Makarchenko et Kerkis, 1991
Genus Pagastia Oliver, 1959
P. sequax (Garrett, 1925)
P. altaica Makarchenko Kerkis & Ivanchenko, 1997
P. lanceolata (Tokunaga, 1936)
P. nivis (Tokunaga, 1936)
P. orientalis (Tshernovskij, 1949)
P. orthogonia Oliver, 1959
P. partica (Roback, 1957)
Genus Potthastia Kieffer, 1922
P. gaedii (Meigen, 1838)
P. iberica Serra-tosio, 1971
P. longimanus Kieffer, 1922
P. montium (Edwards, 1929)
P. pastoris (Edwards, 1933)
Genus Pseudodiamesa Goetghebuer, 1939
P. arctica (Malloch, 1919)
P. branickii (Nowicki, 1837)
P. latistyla Makarchenko, 1989
P. nivosa (Goetghebuer, 1932)
P. pertinax (Garrett, 1925)
P. stackelbergi (Goetghebuer, 1933)
Genus Sympotthastia Pagast, 1947
S. fulva (Johannsen, 1921)
S. gemmaformis Makarchenko, 1994
S. huldeni Tuiskunen, 1986
S. macrocera Serra-Tosio, 1968
S. repentina Makarchenko, 1984
S. spinifera Serra-Tosio, 1968
S. takatensis (Tokunaga, 1936)
S. zavreli Pagast, 1947
Genus Syndiamesa Kieffer, 1918
S. edwardsi (Pagast, 1947)
S. hygropetrica (Kieffer, 1909)
S. mira (Makarchenko, 1980)
S. nigra Rossaro, 1980
S. serratosioi Kownacki, 1981
S. yosiii Tokunaga, 1964

References

Chironomidae
Nematocera tribes